Super Mario World 2: Yoshi's Island is a 1995 platform game developed and published by Nintendo for the Super Nintendo Entertainment System (SNES). The player controls Yoshi, a friendly dinosaur, on a quest to reunite baby Mario with his brother Luigi, who has been kidnapped by Kamek. As a Super Mario series platformer, Yoshi runs and jumps to reach the end of the level while solving puzzles and collecting items with Mario's help. The game has a hand-drawn aesthetic and was the first in the franchise to have Yoshi as its main character, where it introduces his signature flutter jump and egg spawning abilities.

After four years of development, Yoshi's Island was released in Japan in August 1995 and worldwide two months later. Some of its special effects were powered by a new Super FX2 microchip. The game was ported to the Game Boy Advance as Super Mario Advance 3: Yoshi's Island in 2002. This version was rereleased for the Nintendo 3DS and the Wii U's Virtual Console in the early 2010s. The original version was also released for the Super NES Classic Edition and Nintendo Switch Online in the late 2010s.

Yoshi's Island received critical acclaim and sold over four million copies. Reviewers praised the art, sound, level design, and gameplay, and acclaimed Yoshi's Island as a masterpiece and one of the greatest video games of all time. The game brought newfound renown to both Yoshi as a character and Shigeru Miyamoto's artistic and directorial career. The distinct art style and Yoshi's signature characteristics established the Yoshi series of spin-offs and sequels. The game would be the last Super Mario platformer before the series' transition to 3D gameplay, with no further 2D entries for over a decade.

Plot 
A long time ago, Kamek, a Magikoopa, attacks a stork delivering baby brothers Mario and Luigi. He succeeds in kidnapping Baby Luigi, but Baby Mario falls out of the sky and onto the back of Yoshi, the friendly dinosaur, on Yoshi's Island. Yoshi and his friends relay Mario across the island to reach Luigi and rescue him from Kamek, who is in the service of the young Bowser. Bowser wanted to abduct the brothers when Kamek foresaw that they would foil his plans in the future. Yoshi defeats Bowser, saves Luigi, and the stork successfully delivers the brothers to their parents in the Mushroom Kingdom.

Gameplay 

Yoshi's Island is a 2D side-scrolling platform game. In the Super Mario series platform game tradition, the player controls Yoshi in run-and-jump gameplay. The player navigates between platforms and atop some foes en route to the end of the increasingly difficult levels. The player controls one of many Yoshis, which take turns traveling through 48 levels across six worlds to rescue Baby Luigi and reunite the brothers. Yoshi also collects coins to earn extra lives and retains his long tongue from Super Mario World. The game centers more on "puzzle-solving and item-collecting" than other platformers, with hidden flowers and red coins to find. Levels include mines, ski jumps, and "the requisite fiery dungeons". Every fourth level (two in each world) is a boss fight against a large version of a previous foe.

In a style new to the series, the game has a coloring book aesthetic with "scribbled crayon" backgrounds, and Yoshi vocalizes with its every action. Expanding on his "trademark tongue" ability to swallow enemies, Yoshi, as the focus of the game, was given a new move set: the ability to "flutter jump", throw eggs, and transform. The flutter jump gives Yoshi a secondary boost when the player holds the jump button. It became his new "trademark move", similar to that of Luigi in Super Mario Bros. 2. Yoshi can also pound the ground from mid-air to bury objects or break through soft earth, and use his long tongue to grab enemies at a distance. Swallowed enemies can be spat as projectiles immediately or stored for later use as an egg. The player individually aims and fires the eggs at obstacles via a new targeting system. The eggs also bounce off of surfaces in the environment. Up to six eggs can be stored this way, and will trail behind the character. Yoshi can also eat certain items for power-up abilities. For instance, watermelons let Yoshi shoot seeds from his mouth like a machine gun, and fire enemies turn his mouth into a flamethrower. Other power-ups transform Yoshi into vehicles including cars, drills, helicopters, and submarines. A star power-up makes Baby Mario invulnerable and extra fast.

While Yoshi is "virtually invincible", if hit by an enemy, Baby Mario will float off his back in a bubble while a timer counts down to zero. When the timer expires, Koopas arrive to take Baby Mario and Yoshi loses a life. The player can replenish the timer by collecting small stars and power-ups. However, Yoshi can also lose a life instantly if he comes into contact with obstacles such as pits, spikes, lava, and thorns.  Similar to Super Mario World, the player can hold a power-up in reserve, such as a "+10 star" (which adds ten seconds to the Baby Mario timer) or a "magnifying glass" (which reveals all hidden red coins in a level). These power-ups are acquired in several minigames. At the end of each level, the Yoshi relays Baby Mario to the successive Yoshi. If the player perfects all eight levels in each world by finishing with all flowers, red coins, and full 30 seconds on the timer, two hidden levels will unlock. There are three save slots on the cartridge.

The SNES version includes hidden 2-player minigames that can be accessed via a button combination.

The Game Boy Advance version adds an exclusive bonus level for each world with 100% level completion. It also includes four-player support via link cable, but only to play Mario Bros., a pack-in feature also included on the other Super Mario Advance games.

Development
After his introduction in Super Mario World (1990), the character of Yoshi gained popularity and starred in puzzle game spin-offs such as Yoshi and Yoshi's Cookie. Mario creator Shigeru Miyamoto asked Yoshi's designer, Shigefumi Hino, to develop an original project. Hino felt that they had already explored every possible avenue with 2D Mario platformers (the 3D Super Mario 64 being in its preliminary stages at this point). After brainstorming, he landed on the idea of using Yoshi as the main character of a platforming game, with the goal of being more accessible than previous games in the Mario series. To  give the gameplay a more "gentle and relaxed pacing", the levels lack time limits and feature more exploration elements than previous games; Yoshi's flutter jump also makes him easier to control in the air than Mario. In 2020, a prototype for a platform game with similar graphics to Yoshi's Island was discovered, featuring a new protagonist wearing a pilot suit. The name, Super Donkey, suggests it may have been considered as a new Donkey Kong game before being repurposed for Yoshi.

Yoshi's Island was developed by Nintendo EAD and published by Nintendo for the Super Nintendo Entertainment System (SNES) as part of the core Super Mario series. Development was spearheaded by Hino, Takashi Tezuka, Hideki Konno and Toshihiko Nakago, the latter which was his only directing role after an eleven-year apprenticeship, with Miyamoto serving as producer. Newly hired artist Hisashi Nogami created the game's unique marker-drawn style. The graphics were achieved by drawing them by hand, digitally scanning them, and then approximating them pixel-by-pixel. Yoshiaki Koizumi animated the opening and ending, while series composer Koji Kondo wrote the game's music.

Partway into the development of Yoshi's Island, Donkey Kong Country was released, which resulted in its computer-generated graphics becoming the norm for contemporary SNES games. It was too late for the graphic designers to incorporate such a style into Yoshi's Island; instead, they pushed the hand-drawn style further as a way to "fight back". As a compromise, the introductory and ending cutscenes feature a pre-rendered style, contrasting with the rest of the game. According to Miyamoto, Yoshi's Island was in development for four years, which let the team add "lots of magic tricks". The game cartridge used an extra microchip to support the game's rotation, scaling and other sprite-changing special effects. Yoshi's Island was designed to use the Super FX chip, but when Nintendo stopped supporting the chip, the game became the first to use Argonaut Games's Super FX2 microchip. Examples of chip-powered effects include 3D drawbridges falling into the foreground, sprites that are able to dynamically rotate and change size, and a psychedelic undulating effect when Yoshi touches floating fungi.

Release 
Yoshi's Island was released first in Japan in August 1995, and two months later in North America and Europe. At the time of release, the SNES was in its twilight as a console in anticipation of the Nintendo 64, to be released the following year.

Yoshi's Island was ported to the Game Boy Advance as Yoshi's Island: Super Mario Advance 3 in North America on September 23, 2002. In the game's preview at E3 2002, IGN named Yoshi's Island "Best Platformer" on a handheld console. The Game Boy Advance version is a direct port of the original, apart from implementing Kazumi Totaka's voice as Yoshi and adding six additional levels. The visible area was also reduced to fit the handheld's smaller screen. The new cartridge did not need an extra microchip to support the original's special effects.

The Game Boy Advance version was rereleased for the Nintendo 3DS and Wii U via Nintendo's digital Virtual Console platform. The rerelease retains the cropped screen of the handheld version and the pack-in Mario Bros. game, though the multiplayer is disabled. The 3DS version was released on December 16, 2011, as an exclusive reward for early adopters of the Nintendo 3DS. It did not receive a wider release. The Yoshi's Island rerelease for the Wii U was released worldwide on April 24, 2014. At E3 2010, Nintendo demoed "classic" 2D games such as Yoshi's Island as remastered 3D games with a "pop-up book feel". The SNES version was included as a part of the Super NES Classic Edition microconsole in 2017, and is also available in the SNES online app for the Nintendo Switch as part of the paid online service.

Reception 

Upon release in Japan, Yoshi's Island sold over  copies by late 1995, and went on to sell  units in Japan. Internationally, the game has sold over four million copies worldwide, selling  units for the Super Nintendo Entertainment System.

Yoshi's Island received critical acclaim. At the time of its 1995 release, Matt Taylor of Diehard GameFan thought Yoshi's Island could be "possibly the best platform game of all time". Nintendo Power also said that the game was "one of the biggest, most beautiful games ever made". Next Generation was also most impressed by the game's "size and playability". Diehard GameFan three reviewers gave the game a near-perfect score. To wit, Nicholas Dean Des Barres said it was "one of the handful of truly perfect games ever produced", and lamented that the magazine had given Donkey Kong Country, which he felt was a lackluster game in comparison, the extra single point for a perfect score. Casey Loe removed that one point for Baby Mario's "annoying screech". Nintendo Power and Nintendo Life also found Baby Mario's crying sounds annoying. Reviewing the SNES release over a decade later, Kaes Delgrego of Nintendo Life said the crying and some easy boss battles, while both minor, were the only shortcomings. Delgrego credited Yoshi's Island with perfecting the genre, calling it "perhaps the greatest platformer of all time".

Both contemporary and retrospective reviewers praised the art, level design, and gameplay, which became legacies of the game. Some called it "charm". Delgrego of Nintendo Life would stop mid-game just to watch what enemies would do. Martin Watts of the same publication called it "an absolute pleasure on the eyes and unlike any other SNES game". Others praised the control scheme, technical effects, and sound design. Nintendo Life Delgrego felt "goosebumps and tingles" during the ending theme, and marked the soundtrack's range from the lighthearted intro to the "epic grandeur of the final boss battle". GamePro writer Major Mike noted, "[Yoshi's Island] doesn't rely on flashy graphics or jazzy effects to cover an empty game. This is one of the last of a dying breed: a 16-bit game that shows real heart and creativity."

Edge praised the game's balance of challenge and accessibility. The magazine thought that the new power-ups of Yoshi's Island gave its gameplay and level design great range, and that the powers were significant additions to the series on par with the suits of Super Mario Bros. 3 or Yoshi's own debut in Super Mario World. Diehard GameFan Taylor wrote that there was enough gameplay innovation to make him cry and listed his favorites as the Baby Mario cape invincibility power-up, the machine gun-style seed spitting, and the snowball hill level. Nintendo Life Watts called the egg stockpiling system "clever" for the way it encourages experimentation with the environment. Edge thought of Yoshi's Island as a "fusion of technology and creativity, each enhancing the other". The magazine considered the game's special effects expertly integrated into the gameplay, and described the developer's handicraft as having an "attention to detail that few games can match".

The Game Boy Advance version received similar praise. Reviewing the Game Boy Advance release in 2002, Craig Harris of IGN wrote that Yoshi's Island was "the best damn platformer ever developed". While acknowledging the game's roots in the Super Mario series, he said the game created enough gameplay ideas to constitute its own franchise. IGN's Lucas M. Thomas wrote that the game's story was also interesting as the origin story for the Mario brothers. Harris felt that the FX2 sprite-changing effects gave the game "life" and that the Game Boy Advance cartridge could handle the effects just as well. He added that Yoshi's morphing abilities and sound effects were designed well. Levi Buchanan of IGN said the game struck the right balance of tutorial by trial and error. IGN's Harris also noted a few Game Boy Advance-specific issues: framerate drop in areas where a lot is happening onscreen, camera panning problems due to the screen's lower resolution, and a "poor" implementation of the "dizzy" special effect on the handheld release. Critics wrote that the "coloring book"-style graphics held up well. IGN's Harris felt it was the best of the Super Mario Advance games. Of the similar version for the Wii U, Watts of Nintendo Life also noticed the framerate issues and problems resulting from the screen's closer crop, which were "not enough to ruin the game, but ... noticeable". Edge felt that game's only disappointment was the linearity of its overworld following the exploratory Super Mario World and that the sequel would "inevitably ... have less impact". It won for GameSpots annual "Best Graphics on Game Boy Advance" award.

Legacy 

Multiple retrospective critics declared Yoshi's Island a "masterpiece". IGN recalled it as "one of the most loved SNES adventures of all time". Yoshi's Island brought newfound renown to both Yoshi as a character and Shigeru Miyamoto's artistic and directorial career. IGN's Lucas M. Thomas wrote that game marked where Yoshi "came into his own" and developed many of his definitive characteristics: the "signature" flutter jump, and ability to throw eggs and transform shape. Baby Mario, who debuted in the game, went on to feature in a number of sports-related games. Series producer Takashi Tezuka said he consciously continued "the handicraft feel" of the original throughout the series, which later included yarn and similar variations. Official Nintendo Magazine called the art style "a bold step ... that paid off handsomely". Delgrego of Nintendo Life wrote that the game marked a new era of art in video games that prioritized creativity over graphics technology.

Delgrego continued that the game's countdown-based life was a "revolutionary" mechanic that would later become ubiquitous in games like the Halo series. Martin Watts also of Nintendo Life considered Super Mario 64 to be a more momentous event in gaming history, but felt that Yoshi's Island was the "most significant" event in the "Mario Bros. timeline". In a retrospective, IGN wrote that SNES owners embraced the game alongside Donkey Kong Country.

IGN's Jared Petty wrote that Yoshi's Island bested "the test of time far better than many of its contemporaries". Levi Buchanan of IGN thought Nintendo took a risk with Yoshi's Island by making Mario passive and giving Yoshi new abilities. Christian Donlan of 1001 Video Games You Must Play Before You Die wrote that the game was a testament to the Mario team's "staggering confidence" in its development ability. He said the game was "perhaps the most imaginative platformer" of its time. In 1997 Electronic Gaming Monthly ranked it the 7th best console game of all time, saying it "is as much a piece of art as a game" and "is the epitome of platform gaming, falling only inches behind Super Mario Bros. 3 as the best 2-D platformer of all time." Yoshi's Island ranked 22nd on Official Nintendo Magazine 2009 top 100 Nintendo games as a "bone fide classic", 15th on IGN's 2014 top 125 Nintendo games of all time, and second on USgamer's 2015 best Mario platformers list. In 2018, Complex listed the game 14th on its "The Best Super Nintendo Games of All Time". In 1996, GamesMaster ranked Yoshi's Island number 1 on their "The GamesMaster SNES Top 10." In the same issue, GamesMaster rated the game 45th in its "Top 100 Games of All Time."

In July 2020, a large amount of Nintendo data was leaked, including Yoshi's Island source data and several prototypes.

A track based on the game was released for Mario Kart 8 Deluxes Booster Course Pass on March 9, 2023.

Sequels and spin-offs 

Yoshi's Island led to a strong year for Yoshi as a character. IGN's Thomas added that the hand-drawn style of Yoshi's Island made the computer-generated Donkey Kong Country appear outdated, though both games sold well, and Rareware included a Yoshi cameo in their sequel, Donkey Kong Country 2: Diddy's Kong Quest, released that same year. Yoshi's Island graphics and characters were also incorporated into the 1996 SNES puzzle game Tetris Attack.

Following Yoshi's Island success, Nintendo developed Yoshi's Story, a 1998 platformer for the Nintendo 64, which "disappointed" audiences and deflated "massive ... anticipation" with fetch quests and the 3D style Miyamoto eschewed in its predecessor. The Nintendo 64 game expanded on Yoshi's character voice as introduced in Yoshi's Island, but also "dumbed down Yoshi's character". Nintendo created two Yoshi's Island spin-off games: the tilt sensor-controlled Yoshi Topsy Turvy (2004, Game Boy Advance), which was developed by Artoon and was met with mixed reviews, and the Nintendo-developed minigame Yoshi Touch & Go (2005, Nintendo DS). The 1995 original release received a direct sequel in 2006: Yoshi's Island DS, also developed by Artoon. Titled Yoshi's Island 2 until just before it shipped, the game retained the core concept of transporting baby Nintendo characters, and added babies Princess Peach, Bowser, and Donkey Kong, each with an individual special ability. Yoshi had a similar moveset to Yoshi's Island and added dash and float abilities, but he was more passive a character compared to the babies on his back.

About seven years later, series producer Takashi Tezuka decided enough time had passed to make another direct sequel, Yoshi's New Island (2013, Nintendo 3DS). It was developed by former Artoon employees at their new company, Arzest. As in the original, Yoshi carries Baby Mario and throws eggs. The game adds the ability to swallow big foes, which become big eggs that can destroy big obstacles. Yoshi's Island DS developer Arzest assisted in its development. In 1001 Video Games You Must Play Before You Die (2010), Christian Donlan wrote that despite the "streamlined" Yoshi's Story and "brilliant" Yoshi's Touch and Go, "the original was never bettered and never truly advanced upon". In Eurogamer 2015 preview of Yoshi's Woolly World, Tom Phillips wrote that it had "been 20 years since the last truly great Yoshi's Island. The next console release of a Mario 2D side-scroller, New Super Mario Bros. Wii, was released 14 years later.

Notes

References

Further reading

External links 
  

1995 video games
Game Boy Advance games
Nintendo Entertainment Analysis and Development games
Side-scrolling platform games
Super FX games
Super Nintendo Entertainment System games
Video game prequels
Video game sequels
Video games about children
Video games developed in Japan
Virtual Console games
Virtual Console games for Wii U
Yoshi video games
Video games scored by Koji Kondo
Video games directed by Takashi Tezuka
Video games produced by Shigeru Miyamoto
Video games set on fictional islands
Single-player video games
Super Mario
Nintendo Switch Online games
Video games with pre-rendered 3D graphics